Eaten Alive is the sixteenth studio album by American R&B singer Diana Ross, released on September 24, 1985 by RCA Records in the United States, with EMI Records distributing elsewhere. It was Ross' fifth of six albums released by the label during the decade. Primarily written and produced by Barry Gibb of the Bee Gees, with co-writing from his brothers Andy, Maurice, and Robin, the album also includes a contribution from Ross' friend Michael Jackson who co-wrote and performed on the title track.

While Eaten Alive was deemed a commercial failure in the US, where it peaked at No. 45 on the US Billboard 200 and sold less than 300,000 US copies, it fared better internationally, entering the Top 10 in the Netherlands, Sweden, and Switzerland, while reaching No. 11 in Australia and on the UK Albums Chart. Eaten Alive produced the hit single "Chain Reaction", which topped the charts in the UK and Australia, as well as the singles "Eaten Alive" and "Experience".

Background
Eaten Alive was primarily conceived by Bee Gees singer Barry Gibb, who had co-written and co-produced successful albums for Barbra Streisand, Dionne Warwick, and Kenny Rogers earlier that decade. Most of the tracks were co-written by Gibb and at least one of his other siblings Andy, Maurice, and Robin, though some were written by all members of the Bee Gees. The album was remastered and re-released on September 29, 2014 by Funky Town Grooves, with bonus material on a second CD. This reissue was licensed from RCA, which owns rights to the album in the U.S. and Canada and is available in these countries (plus, through imports from Solid Records, also in Japan, even when actually Warner Music Group owns rights here).

Critical reception

In a contemporary review for AllMusic, critic Ron Wynn gave the album three stars out of five and wrote that "Diana Ross got a lot of mileage from this album, although it didn't duplicate the success she'd enjoyed with Swept Away. The title track was a Top Ten R&B hit, thanks in part to Michael Jackson's presence on background vocals, and another single also made the charts. Ross wasn't the powerhouse she was in the 1970s, but she was still doing well enough to keep making records."

The Eaten Alive Demos

The Eaten Alive Demos as sung by Barry Gibb were made available as downloads on iTunes in October 2006. The album contained most of the songs except for the title track and "Chain Reaction". In the spring of 2009, when iTunes changed into DRM-free downloads with higher bit-rates; all of the Barry Gibb demos were no longer available. In August 2011 all of the Barry Gibb demos reappeared on iTunes shortly after the opening of the download store on his official website where many of the same tracks were available. Another demo of the title track by Michael Jackson is known to have been recorded, but, to this date, has not yet surfaced.

Track listing

Original release

Notes
 signifies a co-producer

Personnel 
Credits are adapted from the Eaten Alive liner notes.

Performers

 Diana Ross – lead vocals
 John Barnes – keyboards
 George Bitzer – keyboards, synthesizers, acoustic piano
 Albhy Galuten – synthesizers, arrangements
 James Newton Howard – keyboards, synthesizers
 Greg Phillinganes – keyboards
 Larry Williams – keyboards
 Don Felder – guitars
 Barry Gibb – guitars, backing vocals, arrangements
 George Terry – guitars
 Nathan East – bass
 Steve Gadd – drums
 Paul Leim – drums
 Michael Fisher – percussion
 Kim Hutchcroft – saxophones
 Tom Scott – saxophone
 Bill Reichenbach Jr. (credited as Bill Reichenbach) – trombone
 Gary Grant – trumpet
 Jerry Hey – trumpet
 Michael Jackson – backing vocals on "Eaten Alive"
 Bruce Albertine – backing vocals
 Myrna Matthews – backing vocals
 Marti McCall – backing vocals

Production

 Producers – Albhy Galuten, Barry Gibb and Karl Richardson.
 Co-Producer on Track 1 – Michael Jackson
 Engineers – Jack Joseph Puig and Karl Richardson
 Assistant Engineers – Larry Ferguson, Dan Garcia, Scott Glasel and Julie Last.
 Recorded at Bill Schnee Studio (Hollywood, CA) and Middle Ear Studio (Miami, FL).
 Mixing – Humberto Gatica (Tracks 1 & 3); Elliot Scheiner (Tracks 2, 7 & 9); Jack Joseph Puig (Tracks 4, 5, 6 & 10); Karl Richardson (Track 8).
 Mixed at Middle Ear Studio; Lion Share Recording and Studio 55 (Los Angeles, CA).
 Re-mixing on Track 11 – François Kevorkian and Ron St. Germain
 Mastered by George Marino at Sterling Sound (New York, NY).
 Art Direction and Design – Ria Lewerke
 Artwork – Diana Ross Enterprises, Inc. 
 Photography – Moshe Brakha

Charts

Weekly charts

Year-end charts

References

External links

1985 albums
Diana Ross albums
Capitol Records albums
RCA Records albums
Albums arranged by Barry Gibb
Albums produced by Barry Gibb
Albums produced by Michael Jackson